Ottawa Book Award and Prix du livre d'Ottawa is a Canadian literary award presented by the City of Ottawa to the best English and French language books written in the previous year by a living author residing in Ottawa. There are four awards each year: English fiction and non-fiction (the Ottawa Book Awards); French fiction and non-fiction (Prix du livre d'Ottawa). As of 2011 the four prize winners receive $7,500 each and short-listed authors $1,000 each. The award was founded in 1986. In its earlier years it was named the Ottawa-Carleton Book Awards.

From 1986 to 1990, only a single winner was named each year, with the prize alternating between non-fiction in even-numbered years and fiction in odd-numbered years. Beginning in 1991, separate awards were created for English and French literature, although the alternation between non-fiction and fiction titles each year continued until 2004; ever since, four awards have been presented annually for both English and French fiction and non-fiction. Despite being named as "fiction", however, the fiction category is also open to poetry titles.

Each category is presented only if the committee has received five eligible submissions within the appropriate eligibility period. If this benchmark is not reached, then no award is presented in that category; instead, any submissions that were received are forwarded for consideration in the following year, while the prize money is rolled back into the city's annual arts granting program. To date, only the French categories have ever been delayed in this manner, with the French non-fiction category impacted much more frequently than the French fiction category.

Winners

Fiction (1986-1990)
1987 - John Metcalf, Adult Entertainment
1989 - Maurice Henrie, La Chambre à mourir

Non-fiction (1986-1990)
1986 - Joan Finnigan, Legacies, Legends and Lies and Jean Bruce, Back the Attack! : Canadian Women During the Second World War
1988 - Patricia Morley, Kurelek: A Biography
1990 - Roy MacGregor, Chief: The Fearless Vision of Billy Diamond

English fiction (1991-present)
1991 - Rita Donovan, Dark Jewels
1993 - Rita Donovan, Daisy Circus and Nadine McInnis, The Litmus Body
1995 - John Barton, Notes Towards a Family Tree and Frances Itani, Man Without Face
1997 - Patrick Kavanagh, Gaff Topsails
1999 - Alan Cumyn, Man of Bone
2001 - Alan Cumyn, Burridge Unbound
2003 - Brian Doyle, Mary Ann Alice
2004 - Elizabeth Hay, Garbo Laughs
2005 - Frances Itani, Poached Egg on Toast
2006 - John-James Ford, Bonk on the Head and John Geddes, The Sundog Season
2007 - Janet Lunn, A Rebel's Daughter
2008 - Elizabeth Hay, Late Nights on Air
2009 - Andrew Steinmetz, Eva’s Threepenny Theatre
2010 - Craig Poile, True Concessions
2011 - Gabriella Goliger, Girl Unwrapped
2012 - Jamieson Findlay, The Summer of Permanent Wants
2013 - Missy Marston, The Love Monster
2014 - David O'Meara, A Pretty Sight
2015 - Scott Randall, And to Say Hello
2016 - Nadine McInnis, Delirium for Solo Harp
2017 - John Metcalf, The Museum at the End of the World
2018 - Shane Rhodes, Dead White Men
2019 - Kagiso Lesego Molope, This Book Betrays My Brother
2020 - Henry Beissel, Footprints of Dark Energy
2021 - Conyer Clayton, We Shed Our Skin Like Dynamite
2022 - David O'Meara, Masses on Radar

English non-fiction (1991-present)
1992 - John Sawatsky, Mulroney: The Politics of Ambition
1994 - Penelope Williams, That Other Place: A Personal Account of Breast Cancer
1996 - Clyde Sanger, Malcolm MacDonald: Bringing an End to Empire
1998 - Isaac Vogelfanger, Red Tempest
2000 - Roy MacGregor, A Life in the Bush: Lessons From My Father
2002 - Anna Heilman, Never Far Away
2004 - Madelaine Drohan, Making a Killing: How and Why Corporations Use Armed Force to Do Business
2005 - Valerie Knowles, From Telegrapher to Titan: The Life of William C. Van Horne
2006 - Heather Menzies, No Time: Stress and the Crisis of Modern Life
2007 - Charlotte Gray, Reluctant Genius: The Passionate Life and Inventive Mind of Alexander Graham Bell
2008 - Tim Cook, At the Sharp End: Canadians Fighting the Great War 1914-1916
2009 - Kerry Pither, Dark Days: The Story of Four Canadians Tortured in the Name of Fighting Terror
2010 - Andrew Horrall, Bringing Art to Life: a Biography of Alan Jarvis
2011 - Eric Enno Tamm, The Horse that Leaps Through Clouds
2012 - Ruth B. Phillips, Museum Pieces: Toward the Indigenization of Canadian Museums
2013 - Michael Petrou, Is This Your First War? Travels through the Post - 9/11 Islamic World
2014 - Paul Wells, The Longer I'm Prime Minister: Stephen Harper and Canada, 2006
2015 - Heather Menzies, Reclaiming the Commons for the Common Good
2016 - Tim Cook, Fight to the Finish: Canadians in the Second World War, 1944-1945
2017 - Charlotte Gray, The Promise of Canada: 150 Years - People and Ideas that Have Shaped our Country
2018 - Roy MacGregor, Original Highways: Travelling the Great Rivers of Canada
2019 - Tim Cook, The Secret History of Soldiers: How Canadians Survived the Great War
2020 - Beverley McLachlin, Truth Be Told: My Journey Through Life and the Law
2021 - Suzanne Evans, The Taste of Longing: Ethel Mulvany and Her Starving Prisoners of War Cookbook
2022 - Fen Osler Hampson and Mike Blanchfield, The Two Michaels: Innocent Canadian Captives and High Stakes Espionage in the US-China Cyber War

French fiction (1991-present)
1991 - Daniel Poliquin, Visions de Jude
1993 - Maurice Henrie, Le Pont sur le temps and Gabrielle Poulin, Petites fugues pour une saison sèche
1995 - Andrée Christensen, Noces d’ailleurs
1997 - Maurice Henrie, Le Balcon dans le ciel
1999 - Pierre Raphaël Pelletier, Il faut crier l’injure
2001 - Nicole V. Champeau, Dans les pas de la louve and Michèle Matteau, Quatuor pour cordes sensibles
2003 - Jean Mohsen Fahmy, Ibn Kaldoun: l'honneur et la disgrâce and Nancy Vickers, La Petite Vieille aux poupées
2004 - Maurice Henrie, Mémoire Vive
2005 - Maurice Henrie, Les roses et le verglas and Michel Thérien, L’aridité des fleuves
2006 - Gilles Lacombe, Trafiquante de lumière
2007 - Daniel Poliquin, La Kermesse
2008 - Andrée Christensen, Depuis toujours, j’entendais la mer
2009 - Margaret Michèle Cook, Chronos à sa table de travail
2010 - Claire Rochon, Fragments de Sifnos
2011 - not awarded
2012 - Estelle Beauchamp, Un souffle venu de loin
2013 - Marie-Josée Martin, Un jour, ils entendront mes silences
2014 - not awarded
2015 - Blaise Ndala, J’irai danser sur la tombe de Senghor
2016 - Pierre-Luc Landry, Les corps extraterrestres
2017 - Andrée Christensen, Épines d'encre
2018 - Alain Bernard Marchand, Sept vies, dix-sept morts
2019 - Andrée Christensen, L'Isle aux abeilles noires
2020 - Véronique Sylvain, Premier quart
2021 - Monia Mazigh, Farida
2022 - Michèle Vinet, Le Malaimant

French non-fiction (1991-present)
1992 - not awarded
1994 - Gilberte Paquette, Dans le sillage d’Élizabeth Bruyère
1996 - Elisabeth J. Lacelle, L’incontournable échange. Conversations oecuméniques et pluridisciplinaires
1998 - René Dionne, Histoire de la Littérature Franco-Ontarienne des origines à nos jours
2000 - Patricia Smart, Les femmes du Refus Global
2002 - Françoise Lepage, Histoire de la littérature pour la jeunesse
2004 - Mila Younes, Ma mère, ma fille, ma sœur
2005 - not awarded
2006 - Réjean Robidoux, D’éloge et de critique
2007 - not awarded
2008 - not awarded
2009 - Maurice Henrie, Esprit de sel
2010 - not awarded
2011 - Lucie Joubert, L’envers du landau
2012 - not awarded
2013 - not awarded
2014 - Philippe Bernier Arcand, La dérive populiste
2015 - not awarded
2016 - Patricia Smart, De Marie de l'Incarnation à Nelly Arcan
2017 - not awarded
2018 - not awarded
2019 - Yvon Malette, Entre le risque et le rêve : Une brève histoire des Éditions David
2020 - not awarded
2021 - Nicole V. Champeau, Niagara…la voie qui y mène
2022 - not awarded

References

External links
Ottawa Book Awards

Awards established in 1986
Canadian non-fiction literary awards
Canadian fiction awards
Culture of Ottawa